Sandis Buškevics (born 28 January 1977 in Ventspils, Latvia) is a Latvian professional basketball coach and former player. He is currently an interim head coach for Neptūnas Klaipėda of the Lithuanian Basketball League (LKL). Buškevics was also a member of the Latvia national basketball team.

Coaching career
In January 2018, Buškevics became the head coach of BK Jēkabpils. December 11, 2021 became interim head coach of Neptūnas Klaipėda after Tomas Gaidamavicius stepped out the post due to bad results in 2021–2022 season.

References

1977 births
Living people
ASK Riga players
BC Dynamo Moscow players
BC Lietkabelis coaches
BC Rytas players
BK Liepājas Lauvas players
BK Ventspils players
Latvian expatriate basketball people in Estonia
Latvian men's basketball players
People from Ventspils
PBC Ural Great players
Point guards